Timothy Roderick Hands (born 30 March 1956 in London) is an English schoolmaster and writer. Previously the Master of Magdalen College School, Oxford, he is now the headmaster of Winchester College.

Education 

Hands comes from a family of schoolteachers. His father, Rory K. Hands, was the founding head of Chiswick Comprehensive School in 1968. Timothy Hands was educated in the state sector, at Emanuel School in London, and later studied the violin at the Guildhall School of Music and Drama, before reading English at King's College London, where he also gained a qualification in Theology. He then became a graduate student at Oxford, where he was senior scholar at St Catherine’s and then Oriel College.

Career 
Hands was a Lecturer in English at Oriel College before becoming a housemaster at the King’s School, Canterbury, and then Second Master at Whitgift School. In 1997 he became Headmaster of The Portsmouth Grammar School before moving in January 2008 to Magdalen College School as its 61st Master. Hands has appeared as a spokesman for the independent sector on educational matters, especially partnership between the sectors, and university admissions. He was elected to the Committee of the Headmasters’ and Headmistresses’ Conference in 2003, becoming chairman of its University Committee one year later, and serving in that capacity for seven years. In 2012 he was elected as Chairman of the Conference for 2013-14. He became Headmaster of Winchester College in September 2016. In March 2022 it was announced that Dr Hands will retire in August 2023.

Publications 

Hands has written books on English literature, especially on Thomas Hardy. These include A Hardy Chronology, Thomas Hardy: Distracted Preacher?, and the Hardy volume in Macmillan's "Writers in their Time" series. He contributes to other books about Hardy including the Oxford Reader's Guide and the Ashgate Companion. In 2021 he wrote the illustrated guide to Winchester College's heritage, A Winchester A–Z.

Personal life 

Hands is married to Jane, a London solicitor, and they have two children.

References 

1956 births
Living people
Alumni of King's College London
Alumni of St Catherine's College, Oxford
Alumni of Oriel College, Oxford
Headmasters of Winchester College
Fellows of King's College London
Masters of Magdalen College School, Oxford